Philip Loeb (March 28, 1891 – September 1, 1955), was an American stage, film, and television actor, director and author. He was blacklisted under McCarthyism and committed suicide in response.

Early life
Philip Loeb was born March 28, 1891, in Philadelphia, Pennsylvania. He first performed in a high school production of Lady Gregory's The Workhouse Ward. He served in the Army, then worked as stage manager of The Green Goddess. During his short career, he directed seven Broadway productions and appeared in 36 Broadway plays., his first If I Were King at the Shubert Theatre, 1916 and his last Time Out For Ginger, 1953, at the Lyceum Theatre. Loeb also was co-author of the film adaptation of Room Service starring the Marx Brothers, Loeb had previously appeared in the hit Broadway show of the same name which had a 500 performance run at Broadway's Cort Theatre. His stage career gained strength in the early 1920s when he became associated with the newly formed Theatre Guild in New York City. His stage work lessened in the 1930s, while he worked with Actors' Equity Association. (It is his work with Equity that is thought to have prompted the charges of Communist leanings.)

The Goldbergs

In 1948, Loeb portrayed the role of Jake Goldberg in Gertrude Berg's Broadway play Me and Molly, which was based on Berg's long-running radio show The Goldbergs. The following year, he reprised the role on the television adaptation of The Goldbergs on CBS. Loeb quickly became a viewer favorite as Jake, the exasperated, loving husband to Berg's meddlesome, bighearted Molly Goldberg. He also appeared in the 1950 film adaptation of the series.

Blacklisting 
In June 1950, Loeb was named as a Communist in Red Channels: The Report of Communist Influence in Radio and Television.  Loeb denied being a Communist, but the sponsors of The Goldbergs, General Foods, insisted that he be dropped from the show's cast due to his "controversiality". Berg (who had created the show and owned it on both radio and television) refused to fire Loeb, but Loeb soon resigned, accepting a settlement which was estimated at $40,000 ($ today).

Loeb's last acting job was in the 1953 Broadway production of Time Out for Ginger and its subsequent Chicago production in 1954.

Death 
In his 1996 memoir Inside Out, blacklisted screenwriter Walter Bernstein describes Loeb as being disconsolate and depressed as a result of the blacklisting. Loeb was the sole support of a mentally disturbed son, and was burdened with financial problems. Bernstein was part of a circle of friends including Zero Mostel, and said "I never saw Loeb smile, even when Zero was at his hilarious best."

The following year Loeb committed suicide by taking an overdose of sleeping pills in the Taft Hotel in midtown Manhattan on September 1, 1955. No note was found. Loeb was buried in Mount Sinai Cemetery in his native Philadelphia.

Legacy 
Loeb's suicide was reflected in the character Hecky Brown, played by his real-life friend Zero Mostel (himself a blacklisted performer), in The Front (1976), Martin Ritt's film examining the Hollywood blacklist (also starring Woody Allen). The screenplay of the movie was written by Walter Bernstein, another blacklisted friend.

Loeb's case is also noted in the Philip Roth novel I Married a Communist.
The American Academy of Dramatic Arts—where Loeb was an instructor—awards an annual scholarship in his memory. Equity briefly issued the Philip Loeb Humanitarian Award.

Filmography

References

External links 
 
 

1892 births
1955 suicides
20th-century American Jews
20th-century American male actors
American male stage actors
American male film actors
American male television actors
Burials in Pennsylvania
Drug-related deaths in New York City
Drug-related suicides in New York City
Hollywood blacklist
Jewish American male actors
Male actors from Pennsylvania
Male actors from Philadelphia
Suicides in New York City
United States Army personnel of World War I